Joshua Roland Burgoyne (born 17 October 1989) is an Australian politician who is the member for Braitling in the Northern Territory Legislative Assembly.

|}

Burgoyne was born and raised in Alice Springs, and was elected to parliament for the Country Liberal Party at the 2020 Northern Territory election. At the time he was the youngest member of the Assembly.

Burgoyne previously ran for the Senate at the 2019 Australian federal election as the number two candidate on the CLP ticket but was unsuccessful.

References

1989 births
Living people
Members of the Northern Territory Legislative Assembly
Country Liberal Party members of the Northern Territory Legislative Assembly
21st-century Australian politicians